The Hockey Champions Trophy (HCT) was an international field hockey tournament held by the International Hockey Federation (FIH). It features the top 6 ranked nations in that year.

History
Founded in 1978 by Pakistan's Air Marshal Nur Khan and the Pakistan Hockey Federation, it featured the world's top-ranked field hockey teams competing in a round robin format. A biennial women's tournament was added in 1987. The Champions Trophy was changed from an annual to a biennial event from 2014 onwards, due to the introduction of the Hockey World League (HWL). The 2018 edition was the last edition of the Champions Trophy and the tournament was replaced by the Men's FIH Pro League and the Women's FIH Pro League in 2019.

In the men's tournament, Australia won the tournament fifteen times, Germany ten and the Netherlands eight times. Pakistan is the only Asian champion, with three titles to its name including the first two in 1978 and 1980. In the women's tournament, Argentina and the Netherlands won the trophy seven times. Australia have won the trophy six times, while Germany, China and South Korea have won it one time each.

Since the 2011 edition, eight teams of each six have qualified for the championship. The first edition had five teams, the second had seven, 1987 had eight, and all other editions through 2010 had six. In the year following the Olympics or a World Cup, the participating teams include the host, the defending champion, the world champion and the next highest ranked teams from either the most recent World Cup or Olympic Games.

Men

Summaries

Successful national teams

* = host nation
^ = includes results representing West Germany between 1980 and 1989
~ = includes results representing England
# = states that have since split into two or more independent nations

Team appearances

^ = includes results representing West Germany between 1980 and 1989
~ = includes results representing England
# = states that have since split into two or more independent nations

Australia is the only team to have competed at almost every Champions Trophy, except for only one edition; 14 teams have competed in at least one Champions Trophy.

Women

Summaries

Performance by nation

* = host nation
^ = includes results representing West Germany between 1987 and 1989
~ = includes results representing England

Team appearances

^ = includes result representing West Germany in 1989
~ = includes results representing England

The Netherlands is the only team to have competed at almost every Champions Trophy, except for only one edition; 13 teams have competed in at least one Champions Trophy.

See also
Men's Hockey Champions Challenge I
Women's Hockey Champions Challenge I
Men's FIH Hockey World Cup
Women's FIH Hockey World Cup

References

 
Cham
Recurring sporting events established in 1978
Recurring sporting events disestablished in 2018